"Sleazy Bed Track" is a song by The Bluetones, released as the third single from their second album, 1998's Return to the Last Chance Saloon. It was also included on the band's 2006 compilation A Rough Outline: The Singles & B-Sides 95 - 03, and on the soundtrack to the 2010 Universal Pictures movie Scott Pilgrim vs. the World.

The single contains the b-side "Blue", a cover version of the 1980s Rain Parade song.  Select magazine's review of "Sleazy Bed Track" in August 1998 marked its "astonishing resemblance" to "Fall at Your Feet" by Crowded House. Music Week wrote: "[T]his track is a live favourite and an album standout. It's a swoony ballad with a wonderful melancholic feel which reveals a more mainstream approach to their songwriting."

Track listing
CD
"Sleazy Bed Track"
"The Ballad of Muldoon"
"Blue"
Cassette / 7"
"Sleazy Bed Track"
"The Ballad of Muldoon"

References

The Bluetones songs
1998 singles
1998 songs
Song recordings produced by Hugh Jones (producer)
Songs written by Eds Chesters
Songs written by Adam Devlin
Songs written by Mark Morriss
Songs written by Scott Morriss